Bon Secour Bay is a bay located in Baldwin County, Alabama, United States. The name "Bon Secour" derives from the French phrase meaning "safe harbor" due to the secluded location on the inside coast of the Fort Morgan peninsula of southern Alabama.

References

Bodies of water of Baldwin County, Alabama
Bays of Alabama